The 2015–16 season was Klubi i Futbollit Tirana's 77th competitive season, 77th consecutive season in the Kategoria Superiore and 95th year in existence as a football club.

Season overview

June
The defender Erion Hoxhallari came back to Tirana on 1 June after a long-season loan to Teuta Durrës. On 5 June, Shkëlqim Muça was hired the new head coach of KF Tirana, replacing Gugash Magani who resigned after some poor results at the end of the season. The former Tirana player during '80s signed a three-year contract with the club. One week later, Tirana and Kukësi reached an agreement for the loan of Muça at Kukësi for the club's Europa League matches. On 15 June, Kire Ristevski left the club and signed with Rabotnički of Macedonia.

On 26 June, Tirana completed the signing of former Austria international defender Ronald Gërçaliu on a two-year deal. On the same day, "White and Blues" signed Dritan Smajli from Kukësi on a two-year contract as well. On 28 June, Kavdanski signed a contract until the end of the season. In the last day of the month, Renaldo Kalari signed with the cross-town rivals of Partizani Tirana on a free transfer.

July
On 5 July, Lika left Vllaznia Shkodër to return to Tirana after three seasons, signing a one-year deal. Later on 12th, Tirana signed with Olsi Teqja on a two-year contract for an undisclosed fee. During his presentation, Teqja said that the move to Tirana was "a dream come true".

On 16 July, Masato Fukui signed with Tirana on a free transfer, becoming the first Japanese player to sign for an Albanian club. Five days later, Debatik Curri signed with Flamurtari Vlorë as a free transfer.

August
Mario Morina left Tirana in the first days of August in favour of Flamurtari Vlorë after not finding a mutual way with Tirana for the new contract. On 8 August 2015, Tirana completed the signing of Gilberto Fortunato for an un undisclosed fee, bringing back the Brazilian striker who left his mark in second part of 2013–14 season, where he became a fan favourite.

On 10 August, young forward Florian Kadriu came to the club on trial, which he successfully passed two days later; he was rewarded with a three-year contract. The next day, Gentian Muça returned from his short spell with Kukësi. Midfielder Erjon Vucaj inked a contract with the club for an undisclosed fee after he became a free agent and winning the trial against Flamurtari Vlorë. On 19 August, Alush Gavazaj was sent in a one-season loan at newly promoted side Tërbuni Pukë.

Tirana started the Kategoria Superiore campaign on 23 August, defeating 2–1 the newcomers of Tërbuni Pukë with the goals of Lika and Fukui. On the same day, Entonio Pashaj left the club and joined Flamurtari Vlorë after refusing to be a backup. On 25 August, Tirana purchased Dejan Karan from Hungarian side Kecskeméti on a one-year deal with an option of a further one. Four days later, Tirana announced the signing of Elis Bakaj, who returned on the team only three months after his departure. He was presented to the media on the next day.

September
Tirana started the month with Jetmir Sefa announcing his departure from the club in favour of signing with Vllaznia Shkodër. On 9 September, Marsel Çaka signed a long time contract with the club and was loaned to Kamza for the rest of the season.

In the first league match of September, Tirana didn't go more than a disappointing goalless draw at home against the newly promoted side Bylis Ballsh on 12th. To begin its Albanian Cup campaign, Tirana played its first leg match against Erzeni Shijak. They were able to clinch the victory only in the last minutes of the match thanks to the goal of Florian Kadriu.

October
Tirana endured a strong month as it was started with a 0–1 loss at the hands of rivals Partizani Tirana, which was followed by a 1–1 draw against Flamurtari Vlorë, which got the manager Shkëlqim Muça sacked after only five months on duty. Following that, both assistants of Muça were appointed temporarily managers of the team.

In the first leg of Albanian Cup's second round, Tirana thrashed 5–1 Kastrioti at Krujë with two goals scored by Gilberto and one each for Masato Fukui, Vucaj and Kërçiku. After the match against Vllaznia Shkodër, where the duo failed to secure the win, Tirana begun negotiations with coach Ilir Daja. The negotiations where finally concluded and on 28 October Daja signed a contract until the end of the season. He was presented to the media in the very next day.

November

Ilir Daja debuted with a 2–1 win over Kukësi at Qemal Stafa Stadium on 1 November. The goal of defender Gentian Muça and an own goal from Franc Veliu clinched the win for the capital side. This match was the last for the Brazilian striker Gilberto, who had agreed to terminate his contract by mutual consent before the match.

Tirana continued a fine run with Daja as manager overwhelming 3–0 Tërbuni Pukë at home. The goals were scored by Karan, Elis Bakaj and Gilman Lika. In the middle of the month, Tirana announced that its new home Selman Stërmasi Stadium will be ready at the end of the month to host the league match against Skënderbeu Korçë. In the inaugural match, Tirana disappointed the fans by losing 2–1, with the goals scored by two former players of Tirana, Salihi and Lilaj, which did not celebrate as a sign of respect. For Tirana scored Elis Bakaj via a penalty kick

December
In December, Tirana recorded three goalless draw, respectively against Teuta Durrës, Partizani Tirana and Vllaznia Shkodër. On 23 December, in the last match of the year, Tirana recorded a 1–0 at Kukësi thanks to the header of Gentian Muça, taking the first ever win at Zeqir Ymeri Stadium. Tirana ended the second phase of the league in fourth place with 29 points.

They conceded only two goals during this phrase, all of them against Skënderbeu Korçë, keeping the goal intact in eight of nine matches. They ended the first part of the season as the team with the best defence, conceding 10 goals in 18 matches, less than any other team. On 25 December, Kavdanski left the club by terminated his contract with the club.

January
In January of the following year, during the winter transfer window, Tirana secured the services of the Brazilian duo Hugo Almeida and Alex Willian respectively form Portuguesa and Icasa. They signed both a six-month contract with an option to extend it for a year, and were presented on 13 January. On the same day, the 26-years old defender Endrit Idrizaj returned to the club after spending the last year in loan at Apolonia Fier.

The ethnic Albanian prodigy Florian Kadriu was sent on loan at fellow Kategoria Superiore side Teuta Durrës until the end of the season in order to gain more experience. Stivi Frashëri terminated his contract with Tirana by mutual consensus. Tirana kicked off 2016 by beating away Flamurtari Vlorë in the first leg of quarter-final of Albanian Cup, thanks to an Argjend Malaj winner. Back in Kategoria Superiore, on 30 January, Tirana won comfortably 3–1 away against Tërbuni Pukë to go up in the 3rd place, overtaking Teuta Durrës. The goals were scored by Bakaj, Muzaka and Muça.

February
On 1 February, in the last day of winter transfer window, Tirana signed Enriko Papa from Bylis Ballsh on a free transfer. He signed a one-year contract with the option of a further one. On 6 February, Tirana announced via its official website that they have terminated the contract with Brazilian forward Hugo after he requeried to leave the club due to familiar reasons. However, five hours later, Hugo returned to the team, and also brought his family in Albania, saying that he never asked the club to leave and the situation that was created was a misunderstanding created by his manager, leading Hugo to terminate they cooperation.

A day later, Tirana recorded an emphatic 3–0 away win over Laçi, thanks to the goals of Bakaj, Muzaka and Hugo. That was the first win at Laçi Stadium since 5 May 2012 where Tirana won thanks to a winner of Bekim Balaj. However, during the match Bakaj and Karan were booked meaning that they would miss the following league match against Bylis Ballsh at home. However, during the match Tirana was able to beat Bylis Ballsh 2–0 thanks to the goals of Muzaka and the youngster Majkel Peci, who made his Kategoria Superiore debut. Tirana also registered the first victory at the newly renovated Selman Stërmasi Stadium. In the returning leg of Albanian Cup's quarter-final at Selman Stërmasi Stadium, Tirana was surprisingly knocked out by Flamurtari Vlorë who won 2–1 to qualify in the next round with the aggregate 2–2 (away rule goals), in the match which saw the dismissal of Erion Hoxhallari and Olsi Teqja, leaving Tirana with nine players for the last ten minutes of the match. On 19 February, the vice-captain Gentian Muça successfully underwent surgery in his knee that would rule him out for two months.

Three days later, in the next league match against the league leaders Skënderbeu Korçë, Tirana lost 0–1 in a match which was infamously marred by the "one-sided" decisions of the referee Andi Koçi, who did not give a clear penalty to Tirana's Gilman Lika while awarded an incorrect penalty to Skënderbeu's Hamdi Salihi, who scored the lone goal. Skënderbeu's coach Mirel Josa and also the team's vice captain Orges Shehi and Bakary Nimaga admitted that the penalty of Tirana was correct. A day later, the club's sporting director Devi Muka came out on a press conference to condemn the arbitration of Andi Koçi, while Tirana's coach Ilir Daja accused the referee for not leaving Tirana to fight for the title. One the same day, Tirana filed an official document that requested the lifetime ban of referee Andi Koçi, adding also that Enea Jorgji should not judge any of Tirana matches. On 26 February, Hugo Almeida left the team after terminating his contract with the club by mutual consensus. In the last match of the month, Tirana earned a goalless draw at home against Teuta Durrës, they rivals for the European spot.

March
In the match of the March, Tirana fell 2–0 to Patizani Tirana at Qemal Stafa Stadium, losing out the 3rd spot in the process. The striker Elis Bakaj who made his return from injury in the 50th minute of the match was red-carded five minutes later, leaving the team with ten players, which led the Disciplinary Committee of AFA to suspend him for five matches for his behaviour. In the next match four days later, Tirana didn't go more than a goalless draw against Flamurtari Vlorë at home, felling down to 5th place.

Four days later, Tirana confirmed the bad form recently by losing the Albanian derby 3–1 to Vllaznia Shkodër at Reshit Rusi Stadium. The team took the lead in the 5th minute though an own goal from Stefan Cicmil, but Vllaznia Shkodër bounced back and scored three times, two in the first half.

Tirana tried to react and to turn page in the next match versus Kukësi, but didn't go more than a 1–1 draw, despite leading in the first half with a goal from Gjergji Muzaka. Tirana finished the month without winning a single match; on 22 March, the club fined the defender Dritan Smajli for breaking the rules one day before the match against Kukësi, and was not included in the team for the match. Four days later, Tirana even lost the friendly versus the Albanian First Division side Kamza. In the last day of the month, Tirana liquidated €198.000 debts to its former players and employers, avoiding potential penalties that could be applied by FIFA and UEFA.

April
Tirana commenced the month by taking a 3–0 home victory over Tërbuni Pukë thanks to an Elis Bakaj hat-trick, returning Tirana in the winning ways after six consecutive league matches without a win. That was the second win at Selman Stëmasi Stadium and Elis Bakaj become the first player to score a hat-trick for Tirana since Bekim Balaj on 23 October 2011. On 5 April, Tirana terminated its cooperating with Alex Willian who didn't play a single minute in the senor team in competitive matches, being reduced to play only with the reserve side. Tirana then defeated Laçi at home thanks again to Elis Bakaj winner to keep the European chances alive.

After that, Tirana made another false step as they didn't go more than a goalless against the penultimate side of Bylis Ballsh. In the next match, Tirana suffered another defeat at the hands of Skënderbeu Korçë, losing 1–0 at Selman Stërmasi Stadium thanks to the Hamdi Salihi's later winner. That was Tirana's fourth league loss against Skënderbeu Korçë in as many matches played. In the last league match for this month, Teuta Durrës held Tirana to a 0–0 draw at Niko Dovana Stadium.

May
Tirana begun May with a 2–2 home draw against Partizani Tirana, with the goals scored by Gentian Muça and Elis Bakaj. The team was on lead until 94th minute, but Partizani levelled the scored thanks to a Realdo Fili strike. For singing anti-Partizani crust with the fans, Gentian Muça was accused of public incitement of hatred, and was banned for one year from all competitions by the Disciplinary Committee of AFA, effective immediately. Also Tirana's stadium was banned for eight matches for its fans behaviour, also the Sporting Director Devi Muka was banned for ten matches after assaulting a Partizani Tirana member staff.

On 8 May, in the next league match, Tirana lost 2–1 away to Flamurtari Vlorë, leaving Tirana mathematically out of European competitions for the fourth consecutive season. In the last match at home, Tirana beat Vllaznia Shkodër thanks to the lone goal of Elis Bakaj, his 13th in the league. On final day of the season, Tirana was defeated 2–1 away to Kukësi to finish the season in the 5th position, remaining out of European competitions for the fourth consecutive year. Tirana collected 53 points, 18 less the last season.

Players

Squad information

Transfers

Transfers in

Transfers out

Loans out

Pre-season and friendlies

Competitions

Kategoria Superiore

League table

Results summary

Results by round

Matches

Albanian Cup

First round

Second round

Quarter-final

Statistics

Squad stats
{|class="wikitable" style="text-align: center;"
|-
!
! style="width:70px;"|League
! style="width:70px;"|Cup
! style="width:70px;"|Total Stats
|-
|align=left|Games played       ||36||6 ||42
|-
|align=left|Games won          ||13||5 ||18
|-
|align=left|Games drawn        ||14||0 ||14
|-
|align=left|Games lost         ||9 ||1 ||10
|-
|align=left|Goals scored       ||37||12||49
|-
|align=left|Goals conceded     ||25||4 ||29
|-
|align=left|Goal difference    ||12||8 ||20
|-
|align=left|Clean sheets       ||19||3 ||21
|-

Top scorers

Last updated: 19 May 2016

Clean sheets
The list is sorted by shirt number when total appearances are equal.

Notes

References

External links
Official website

 

KF Tirana seasons
Tirana